Hulston is an extinct town in Dade County, in the U.S. state of Missouri. The GNIS classifies it as a populated place.

A post office called Hulston was established in 1895, and remained in operation until 1904. The community was named after Christ Hulston, the proprietor of a local mill.

References

Ghost towns in Missouri
Former populated places in Dade County, Missouri